The Church of St Constantine and Helena is a church in Plovdiv, Bulgaria. It is considered to be among the oldest churches in the city. It was built in 337 at the sight of an ancient pagan temple in the acropolis on one of the fortified hills. The church was named after Emperor Constantine the Great and his mother Elena. During the years, the building was destroyed and rebuilt several times. Its current edifice was constructed in 1832 with the help of local patriots. Its magnificent frescoes and icons were painted by masters of one of the most famous Bulgarian Icongraphic Schools: the Debar School. Some of the icons and painting of the church were made by the famous Bulgarian National Revival painter Zahari Zograf who lived and worked in Plovdiv between 1836 and 1840.

Gallery

External links

Bulgarian Orthodox churches in Bulgaria
Churches in Plovdiv